Physical Review X is a peer-reviewed open access scientific journal published by the American Physical Society covering all branches of pure, applied, and interdisciplinary physics. It carefully applies highly selective editorial standards and aims to attract, select, and publish papers that are exceptional in originality, substance, and significance. It is part of the Physical Review family of journals. The lead editors are Jean-Michel Raimond of the Université Pierre-et-Marie-Curie and M. Cristina Marchetti of University of California, Santa Barbara. According to the Journal Citation Reports, the journal had a 2021 impact factor of 14.417.

History 
The journal was announced in January 2011 and began publishing papers in August 2011. An early editorial outlined the journal's publishing philosophy. The first editor was Jorge Pullin.

References

External links 
 

Publications established in 2011
Physics journals
English-language journals
Quarterly journals
American Physical Society academic journals
Creative Commons Attribution-licensed journals
Online-only journals